Percy Hetherington Fitzgerald (26 April 1830 – 24 November 1925) was an Anglo-Irish author and critic, painter and sculptor.

Fitzgerald was born in Ireland at Fane Valley, County Louth, the son of Thomas FitzGerald.  He was educated at Belvedere college Dublin, Stonyhurst College, Lancashire, and at Trinity College, Dublin.  He was called to the Irish bar and was for a time crown prosecutor on the northeastern circuit.

After moving to London, he became a contributor to Charles Dickens's magazine, Household Words, and later dramatic critic for the Observer and the Whitehall Review.  Among his many writings are numerous biographies and works relating to the history of the theatre.  He wrote:
 Life of Sterne (1864) (See Sterne.); 2nd edition; revised & enlarged (1896); reprinted 1904
 Charles Lamb (1866) (See Charles Lamb.)
 Life of David Garrick (1868) (See David Garrick.)
 The Kembles (1871)
 The Romance of the English Stage (1874) 
 Life of George IV (1881) (See George IV.)
 A New History of the English Stage (1882)
 Recreations of a Literary Man (1882)
 Life and Times of William IV (1884) (See William IV.)
 Lives of the Sheridans (1886)
 The Book Fancier (1886)
 
Life of James Boswell (of Auchinleck) with an Account of His Sayings, Doings, and Writings (1891) (See James Boswell.)
 Henry Irving: A Record of Twenty Years at the Lyceum (1893) 
 The Savoy Opera and the Savoyards (1894) (deals with operas of Gilbert and Sullivan.)
 Memoirs of an Author (London, 1895)
 A Critical Examination of Dr G. Birkbeck Hill's "Johnsonian" Editions (1898)
 The Garrick Club (1904)
 Life of Charles Dickens (1905)
 Sir Henry Irving, A Biography (1906)
 
 Boswell's Autobiography (1912)
 Memories of Charles Dickens (1913)
 Worldlyman (1914)

In 1900 he completed a bust of his friend Charles Dickens, which can be seen in the Pump Room in Bath.
In 1910 he created a statue of Samuel Johnson (Reference), which is standing behind St Clement Danes, Strand, London. (Photo)

He is buried at Glasnevin Cemetery, Dublin.

Notes

References

External links

 
 
 
 

1834 births
1925 deaths
Alumni of Trinity College Dublin
Burials at Glasnevin Cemetery
English biographers
19th-century British historians
People educated at Stonyhurst College
People educated at Belvedere College
20th-century British historians